Nehemiah Perry (March 30, 1816 – November 1, 1881) was an American clerk, cloth manufacturer and Democratic Party politician who represented  in the United States House of Representatives from 1861 to 1865.

Biography 
Born in Ridgefield, Connecticut, Perry was educated there at Wesleyan Seminary. He clerked in a store in Norwalk, Connecticut and another in New York City. He moved to Newark, New Jersey in 1836 and engaged in manufacturing cloth and other work in the clothing business. He was a member of the New Jersey General Assembly in 1850 and 1856, serving as Speaker of the Assembly in the latter year. He was a member of the Newark Common Council in 1852.

Perry was elected a Democrat to Congress in 1860, defeating the incumbent Republican Speaker of the House, William Pennington. Perry served from 1861 to 1865, not seeking re-election in 1864. Afterwards, Perry resumed former manufacturing pursuits and was mayor of Newark, New Jersey in 1873. He died in Newark on November 1, 1881 and was interred in Mount Pleasant Cemetery in Newark.

External links

Nehemiah Perry at The Political Graveyard

1816 births
1881 deaths
Burials at Mount Pleasant Cemetery (Newark, New Jersey)
Democratic Party members of the United States House of Representatives from New Jersey
Mayors of Newark, New Jersey
People from Ridgefield, Connecticut
Politicians from New York City
Speakers of the New Jersey General Assembly
Democratic Party members of the New Jersey General Assembly
19th-century American politicians
19th-century American businesspeople